Men's Combined World Cup 2002/2003

Final point standings

In Men's Combined World Cup 2002/03 both results count.

Note:

In both events not all points were awarded (not enough starters/finishers).

References
 fis-ski.com

World Cup
FIS Alpine Ski World Cup men's combined discipline titles